Lucus Augusti is the Latin name of two different ancient places in the Roman Empire:

Lugo, a city in Spain
Luc-en-Diois, a city in France